Kariyawasam Indipalage Charith Asalanka (born 29 June 1997) is a Sri Lankan professional cricketer who plays all three formats of the game for the national team and also serves as the vice-captain of the national team in T20I. A left-handed batsman, Asalanka made his international debut for Sri Lanka in June 2021

Early career
Asalanka toured England with the Sri Lanka under-17 team in 2013, opening the batting and top-scoring in each innings with 92 and 31 in a three-day match against an English under-17 team at Loughborough. He opened the batting for his school, Richmond College, Galle in 2014–15, helping them into the final of the schools' twenty-20 competition. He captained the national under-19 team against under-19 teams from Australia and Bangladesh in 2014–15. In the five-match limited-overs series against Bangladesh under-19, he was Sri Lanka's highest scorer, with 225 runs at an average of 45.00, and second-highest wicket-taker, with eight wickets at 21.00. He was most prominent in Sri Lanka's victory in the first match, with 4 for 36 and 63. He was awarded Schoolboy Cricketer of the Year award in the years 2015 and 2016 becoming only the seventh player to win the award twice.

Domestic career
Asalanka made his first-class debut in April 2015, in the match to decide who should take the final place in the Premier Trophy in the following season. His team, Galle, batted first and were all out for 31. Sri Lanka Air Force Sports Club made 215 in reply. In their second innings Galle lost their first wicket in the second over, but Asalanka, batting at number three, hit 114 off 123 balls, and Galle totalled 295. Sri Lanka Air Force Sports Club needed 112 to win, but Asalanka took 4 for 34 (Malith de Silva, also making his first class debut, took 6 for 46) to dismiss them for 107, and Galle won by four runs.

He made his Twenty20 debut for Sinhalese Sports Club in the 2017–18 SLC Twenty20 Tournament on 1 March 2018.

In April 2018, he was named in Kandy's squad for the 2018 Super Provincial One Day Tournament. In August 2018, he was named in Kandy's squad for the 2018 SLC T20 League. He was the leading wicket-taker for Kandy in the tournament, with ten dismissals in six matches. In October 2020, he was drafted by the Jaffna Stallions for the inaugural edition of the Lanka Premier League.

In March 2021, he captained Sinhalese Sports Club as they won the 2020–21 SLC Twenty20 Tournament, the first time they had won the tournament since 2005.

On March 24, 2021, in the Major Clubs Limited Over Tournament, Asalanka scored a brilliant unbeaten century against Police Sports Club: 178 runs from 145 balls, with 16 boundaries and 5 sixes. Sinhalese Sports Club scored 339 runs and won the match by 31 runs. On April 1, 2021, again in the Major Clubs Limited Over Tournament, Asalanka scored a match-winning century against Colts Cricket Club: 101 not out from 89 balls while chasing 278 runs, with a productive partnership with Avishka Fernando. Sinhalese Sports Club won by 8 wickets with 68 balls remaining.

In August 2021, he was named as the vice-captain of the SLC Greys team for the 2021 SLC Invitational T20 League tournament. In November 2021, he was selected to play for the Kandy Warriors following the players' draft for the 2021 Lanka Premier League.

During 4th match of National Super League, while representing team Colombo Asalanka scored 13th List A half century against team Dambulla while chasing 143 runs. He also took two wickets while bowling. Finally team Colombo won the match by 7 wickets. In July 2022, he was signed by the Colombo Stars for the third edition of the Lanka Premier League.

U19 captaincy and international career
Asalanka captained Sri Lanka under-19 in a two-match series against Pakistan under-19 in October 2015, scoring 334 runs at an average of 167.00, with a double-century and a century. He also captained Sri Lanka in the 2016 Under-19 Cricket World Cup.

In November 2018, he was added to Sri Lanka's Test squad for their series against England, but he did not play. In December 2018, he was named as the captain of the Sri Lanka team for the 2018 ACC Emerging Teams Asia Cup. In November 2019, he was named as the captain of Sri Lanka's squad for the 2019 ACC Emerging Teams Asia Cup in Bangladesh. Later the same month, he was named as the captain of Sri Lanka's squad for the cricket tournament at the 2019 South Asian Games. The Sri Lanka team won the silver medal, after they lost to Bangladesh by seven wickets in the final.

International career
In June 2021, Asalanka was named in Sri Lanka's squad for their tour of England. He made his One Day International (ODI) debut on 29 June 2021, for Sri Lanka against England. In July 2021, he was named in Sri Lanka's squad for their series against India. On 19 July 2021, Asalanka scored his maiden ODI fifty against India. He made his T20I debut on 25 July 2021, for Sri Lanka against India.

In the first ODI against South Africa on 2 September 2021, Asalanka scored his second ODI half century. During the course, he put match winning partnership with Avishka Fernando. Finally, Sri Lanka won the match by 14 runs. In the second ODI, he made another fifty in a losing course. In the third ODI, Asalanka scored 47 runs and helped Sri Lanka to post a total of 203 runs in 50 overs. Later he took his first ODI wicket by dismissing Andile Phehlukwayo. Finally, Sri Lanka won the match by 78 runs and Asalanka won the player of the series award for his consistent batting performance as the highest run getter of the series. Later the same month, Asalanka was named in Sri Lanka's squad for the 2021 ICC Men's T20 World Cup.

On 24 October 2021, Asalanka scored his maiden T20I half century against Bangladesh. While chasing 171 runs, he scored unbeaten 80 runs from 49 deliveries hitting five boundaries and five sixes. Finally Sri Lanka won the match by 5 wickets and Asalanka won player of the match award for his performance.

On 4 November 2021, against West Indies Asalanka scored second T20I half century. He hit eight boundaries and one six while scoring 68 runs from 41 balls. Finally Sri Lanka won the match by 20 runs and Asalanka won player of the match award for his performance. He is highest run scorer for Sri Lanka and 5th highest run scorer in T20 world cup 2021 scoring 231 runs in 6 matches with average of 46.20 hitting two half centuries. In November 2021, he was named in Sri Lanka's Test squad for their series against the West Indies. He made his Test debut, against the West Indies, on 29 November 2021.

On January 16, 2022, in the first ODI against Zimbabwe, Asalanka scored his fourth ODI half century. While chasing down 297 runs he scored 71 runs from 68 balls hitting six fours and two sixes. Asalanka and Dinesh Chandimal put on a 132-run partnership. Sri Lanka won the match by 5 wickets. On 3rd ODI match against Zimbabwe, Asalanka scored fifth ODI half century. He scored 52 runs from 56 deliveries. During that process Asalanka scored 2000 List A runs. Finally Sri Lanka won the match by 184 runs and won the series. Asalanka won player of the match award for his performance. On 21 June 2022, fourth ODI against Australia, Asalanka scored his maiden ODI century. He scored 110 runs from 106 balls hitting 10 boundaries and one six. His knock helped Sri Lanka scored 258 runs and won the match by 4 runs and won the series. Asalanka won player of the match award for his performance.

On 30 November 2022, 3rd ODI against Afghanistan, Asalanka scored 6th ODI half century. He scored unbeaten 83 runs hitting five boundaries and four sixes. Because of his knock Sri Lanka successfully chased down the target of 313 and Asalanka won player of the match award for his performance.

References

External links

1997 births
Living people
Sri Lankan cricketers
Sri Lanka Test cricketers
Sri Lanka One Day International cricketers
Sri Lanka Twenty20 International cricketers
Galle Cricket Club cricketers
Sinhalese Sports Club cricketers
Mohammedan Sporting Club cricketers
Jaffna Kings cricketers
Kandy Falcons cricketers
People from Galle District
Alumni of Richmond College, Galle
South Asian Games silver medalists for Sri Lanka
South Asian Games medalists in cricket